Yarukkum Vetkam Illai is a 1975 Indian Tamil-language film, directed by Cho Ramaswamy. It stars Jayalalithaa in the lead role, opposite Srikanth, supported by Cho, Manorama and Sivakumar. This film was based on the book by the same name and later a play written by Cho. It was released on 13 June 1975.

Plot

Cast 
 Jayalalithaa
 Srikanth
 Cho Ramaswamy
 Manorama
 Sivakumar
 Sukumari

Themes 
The film revolves around the "hypocrisy of society on prostitution".

Soundtrack 
The music was composed by G. K. Venkatesh. The title song by Yesudas questions "the double standards laid in society for men and women" and "Anaiyaatha Deepam" raises questions about "morality, religion and humanitarianism".

Accolades 
Jayalalithaa won the Tamil Nadu State Film Award for Best Actress.

References

External links 
 

1970s Tamil-language films
1975 films
Films about prostitution in India
Films based on Indian novels
Films directed by Cho Ramaswamy
Films scored by G. K. Venkatesh
Indian films based on plays